Maxine L. Stitzer is an American research psychologist. She is an emeritus professor of the behavioral pharmacology research unit of Johns Hopkins School of Medicine in Baltimore, Maryland. She has been a professor at Johns Hopkins since 1992. Her principal research has been on the treatment of addiction using a contingency management approach.

Publications 

 Strain E., Stitzer M. (eds.) Methadone Treatment for Opioid Dependence. (1999). United Kingdom: Johns Hopkins University Press.

Awards and recognition 

 Nathan B. Eddy Award from the College on Problems of Drug Dependence (2019)
 The Award for Scientific Translation from the Society for the Advancement of Behavior Analysis (2013)

References 

Year of birth missing (living people)
Living people
Johns Hopkins School of Medicine faculty